Rountree is a neighborhood in central Springfield, Missouri. The neighborhood's borders are marked by Missouri State University to the west, Glenstone Avenue to the east, Catalpa Street to the south, and Cherry Street to the north. Rountree is predominantly residential, but is home to several popular restaurants, bakeries, and other businesses. The majority of homes in Rountree were constructed during the 1910s and 1920s. Architecture in the neighborhood is diverse, with many examples of Craftsman, Foursquare, and Federalist styles.

Rountree, like other neighborhoods in central Springfield, is markedly more liberal in its voting patterns than other parts of the city. This may be due to its close proximity to the Missouri State University campus.

The neighborhood's name derives from the N.M. Rountree Elementary School, located within the neighborhood on Grand Street. The school, in turn, is named  the founder of the historic Keet-Rountree store in Springfield. The neighborhood hosts annual Fourth of July and Halloween parades that draw hundreds from around the city. Rountree is regularly ranked by 417 Magazine as among Springfield's best neighborhoods.

References 

Geography of Springfield, Missouri
Neighborhoods in Missouri